The 1949 Princeton Tigers football team was an American football team that represented Princeton University as an independent during the 1949 college football season. In its fourth season under head coach Charlie Caldwell, the team compiled a 6–3 record, outscored opponents by a total of 192 to 137, and was ranked No. 18 in the final AP Poll. Princeton played its 1949 home games at Palmer Stadium in Princeton, New Jersey.

Schedule

References

Princeton
Princeton Tigers football seasons
Princeton Tigers football